was a Japanese film editor. Mainly working at Toho, he edited over 100 films, including Rickshaw Man, for which Hiroshi Inagaki won the Golden Lion at the Venice Film Festival. He worked on many Toho war films as well as on several editions of the Godzilla series. He also edited many of the films of Kihachi Okamoto.

Selected filmography
Monkey Sun (孫悟空 Son Gokū) (1959)
Submarine I-57 Will Not Surrender (潜水艦イ-57降伏せず Sensuikan I-57 kofuku sezu) (1959)
Desperado Outpost (独立愚連隊 Dokuritsu gurentai) (1959)
Oh Bomb (ああ爆弾 Aa bakudan) (1964)
Samurai Assassin (侍 Samurai) (1965)
The Sword of Doom (大菩薩峠 Daibosatsu Tōge) (1966)
Japan's Longest Day (日本のいちばん長い日 Nihon no ichiban nagai hi) (1967)
Kill! (斬る Kiru) (1968)
Battle of Okinawa (激動の昭和史 沖縄決戦 Gekidō no Shōwashi: Okinawa Kessen) (1971)
Godzilla vs. Hedorah (ゴジラ対ヘドラ Gojira tai Hedora) (1971)
Terror of Mechagodzilla (メカゴジラの逆襲 Mekagojira no Gyakushū) (1975)
Sugata Sanshirō (姿三四郎) (1977)
The Last Dinosaur (1977)
Blue Christmas (ブルークリスマス Burū Kurisimasu) (1978)
Pink Lady no Katsudō Daishashin (1978)
The Bushido Blade (1981)
The Return of Godzilla (ゴジラ Gojira) (1984)
Hiruko the Goblin (妖怪ハンター ヒルコ Ghost Hunter: Hiruko) (1991)

References

External links

Japanese film editors
1931 births
2012 deaths